Borgund is a small village in Lærdal Municipality in Sogn og Fjordane county, Norway. It is the site of the Borgund Church and the historic Borgund Stave Church. Historically, the village was part of the old Borgund Municipality which existed from 1864 until its dissolution in 1964.

Name
The municipality (originally the parish) was named after the old Borgund farm, where the historic Borgund Stave Church is located.  The name is derived from the old word Borg meaning "fortress" or "stronghold".

References

Lærdal
Villages in Vestland